Andrei Burlacu (born 12 January 1997) is a Romanian professional footballer who plays as a forward for Liga I club FC Botoșani.

Career statistics

Club

Honours
Universitatea Craiova
Cupa României: 2017–18
Supercupa României runner-up: 2018

References

External links

1997 births
Living people
Sportspeople from Botoșani
Romanian footballers
Association football forwards
Romania under-21 international footballers
Liga I players
Liga II players
CS Universitatea Craiova players
FC Politehnica Iași (2010) players
AFC Chindia Târgoviște players
CS Concordia Chiajna players
FC Steaua București players
CS Mioveni players
FC Botoșani players